Předměřice nad Labem is a municipality and village in Hradec Králové District in the Hradec Králové Region of the Czech Republic. It has about 1,800 inhabitants.

Notable people
Katharina Marschall (1740–c.1820), female soldier

References

Villages in Hradec Králové District